Four Stars (also known as ****) is a 1967 avant-garde film by Andy Warhol, actually consisting of 25 hours of film. In typical Warhol fashion of the period, each reel of the film is 35 minutes long, or 1200 ft. in length, and is shot in sync-sound.

The film's title is a pun on the rating system used by critics to rank films, with "four stars" being the highest rating.

Overview
As opposed to Warhol's earlier sound films during this period, such as Vinyl, made in 1965, in which the camera, once turned on, was never stopped until the film ran out in one continuous take, Four Stars uses what critic Gene Youngblood dubbed "strobe cuts", created by turning the camera on and off during shooting, causing several overexposed or "whited-out" frames, to appear in the completed film, and an accompanying burst of sound on the film's soundtrack. However, apart from this "in-camera" editing, no other edits were made in the finished film; each reel, as in all of his films during this period, runs 1200 feet (366 m) in length. Warhol uses these "strobe cuts" as punctuation for the images in the film, which document Factory life during this period, and feature a cast of Warhol "superstars" including Edie Sedgwick, Ondine, Brigid Berlin, Viva, Nico, Mary Woronov, Gerard Malanga, Ultra Violet, Ruby Lynn Reyner, Taylor Mead, Joe Dallesandro (in his film debut), and others.

Photographed entirely in color, Four Stars was projected in its complete length of nearly 25 hours (allowing for projection overlap of the 35-minute reels) only once, at the Film-Makers' Cinematheque in the basement of the now-demolished Wurlitzer Building at 125 West 41st Street in New York City. The imagery in the film is dense, wearying and beautiful, but ultimately hard to decipher, for, in contrast to his earlier, and more famous film Chelsea Girls, made in 1966, Warhol directed that two reels be screened simultaneously on top of each other on a single screen, rather than side-by-side.

This created two levels of imagery for the entire running time of the film, along with two levels of sound to contend with at the same time. Warhol attended the screening for the entire length of the film, and later remarked that he knew that "this was the last time we would be making films for ourselves."

Shortly thereafter, Warhol turned his hand to more commercial efforts, and after his near fatal shooting at his second studio at 33 Union Square West by Valerie Solanas, Paul Morrissey effectively took over production of films produced under the Warhol banner.

After the one marathon screening of Four Stars, the film was broken down into many shorter works, such as Imitation of Christ, and a two-hour excerpt from the film was shown for several weeks afterward under the same title at the Cinematheque, although it had little of the impact of the original film.

See also
List of American films of 1967
Andy Warhol filmography
List of longest films by running time

References

External links

1967 films
Films directed by Andy Warhol
American avant-garde and experimental films
Compilation films
1960s English-language films
1960s American films